Varalaru: History Of Godfather, or simply known as Varalaru, is a 2006 Indian Tamil-language action-drama film  written and directed by K. S. Ravikumar, and produced by S. S. Chakravarthy under the banner NIC Arts. The film stars Ajith Kumar in a triple role as a father and his twin sons alongside Asin,  Ramesh Khanna, Suman Setty,  Kanika,  Sujatha and M. S. Baskar play supporting roles. The film's soundtrack and background score was composed by A. R. Rahman. The film ran for 210 days and became a blockbuster at the box office. Prior to its release, the film was known by its title Godfather, but following the Government of Tamil Nadu's motion to exempt tax on films titled in Tamil in 2006, the film's title was changed. After two years of production, the film was released on 20 October 2006 during the eve of Diwali, and emerged as the highest grosser of the year. The film has been remade in Kannada, titled Godfather and in Burmese as Nat Khat Mhar Tae Tite Pwal, and in Odia as Tu Mo Dehara Chhai. This film was Sujatha’s final appearance before her retirement and eventual demise in 2011.

Plot
Shivashankar, a crippled multi-millionaire, sends his spoilt son Vishnu to Thottapuram to help the poor. Vishnu does not want to go, but a local pizza restaurateur convinces Vishnu and his friends that the village is one big brothel. Thottapuram is a sacred village and the restaurateur had purposefully deceived Vishnu and his friends. Also Divya and her college classmates are visiting the village. They come for their social activity course to improve the village's health and hygiene. A large building is reserved for him and the girls are asked to stay in the poor families' houses. Vishnu and his friends arrive and start to woo the girls, whom they mistake for Thottapuram's prostitutes. When Divya discovers their plan, she and her friends decide to teach Vishnu and his friends a lesson.

Vishnu and his friends are wooed by Divya and the other girls. They are led to separate rooms where the girls inject a serum that makes them itch all over. They leave, screaming and scratching. Vishnu tells Divya to leave her profession and offers to save her honour by marrying her in the village temple the next day. Divya does not come, but Vishnu and his friends happen to see her leaving on a bus bearing the name of the girls' college, revealing that they have been duped. But, Divya got guilt ridden when she watches him carrying mangala sutra and really got ready to marry her. Depressed and feeling cheated, Vishnu returns home, Shivshankar discovers that his son fell in love. Under his influence, Vishnu and Divya get engaged. Everything goes well until one night, Vishnu goes to Divya's house in a drunken state. Her family prevent him from talking to her. This eventually leads to a fight. Vishnu then goes to Divya's cousin's house to meet Divya and apologises for his behaviour, but suddenly attempts to rape Divya's cousin which Divya got horrified when noticing. Then on the same day at night, Vishnu tries to kill Shivashankar, but is stopped by Ko Thandam, Sivashankar's P.A., who got stabbed by Vishnu. Disappointed with Vishnu's behaviour, Shivashankar sends Vishnu to a psychiatrist .

It is then revealed that Jeeva, Vishnu's twin, had assumed Vishnu's identity, took money from the bank, got drunk and went to Divya's place and attempted to rape Divya's cousin. Jeeva hates Shivashankar for abandoning him and his mentally-challenged mother Gayathri. Later, Divya manages to sneak into Vishnu's room in the hospital and believes his explanation that he is innocent. She leaves and shortly afterwards, Jeeva appears, smuggles and dumps Vishnu out of the hospital, takes over his identity and goes to kill Shivashankar. The father notices that it is not his son after he gets a call from the real son and gets out of his wheelchair to defend himself, much to Jeeva's surprise. Vishnu arrives at the scene, surprised that his father is able to walk and demands an explanation.

Shivashankar tells him that he was a Bharatanatyam dancer who behaved effeminately due to dancing and the upbringing of his mother, whom he loved dearly. His mother had arranged for Shivashankar to marry Gayathri, who was her friend's daughter. He agreed but Gayathri rejected Shivashankar for being too effeminate and insulted him in front of crowd in the wedding. Unable to bear the embarrassment, Shivashankar's mother died on the spot. Enraged, Shivashankar raped and impregnated Gayathri. The doctor refused to give her an abortion, leading to Vishnu's birth. Shivashankar took Vishnu from his mother saying the child would be the only hope of his life. But, unknown to Sivashankar, right after he left Gayathri gave birth to another baby who was Jeeva.

Jeeva escapes and threatens to kill Shivashankar at Vishnu's and Divya's wedding. Shivashankar fights with Vishnu and attempts to stop him. Jeeva points a gun at Shivashankar and reveals that he is also Shivashankar's son and the reason for why he came to kill Shivashankar. Jeeva's grandmother tells them that Gayathri actually became an insane when Jeeva was about to get hit by a lorry, when he was a baby. Jeeva realises his mistake. He wants Shivashankar to shoot him, but a police officer mistakenly thinks that Jeeva is pointing the gun at Shivashankar. He fires at Jeeva, but Shivashankar intervenes and gets shot in between. Jeeva accepts Shivashankar's apology and gets arrested.

Weeks later, Gayathri does not accept food from anyone, until Vishnu comes dressed up as Jeeva and feeds her. The film ends with Vishnu telling her that Shivashankar is the godfather of family.

Cast

 Ajith Kumar in a triple role as Shiva Shankar (father), Vishnu and Jeeva (sons)
 Asin as Divya, Vishnu's love interest, later wife
 Kanika as Gayathri, Vishnu and Jeeva's mother
 Sujatha as Gayathri's mother
 Rajesh as the Assistant Commissioner of Police
 Vijayan as Divya's father
 Mansoor Ali Khan as Divya's brother
 Ponnambalam as Divya's brother
 Ramesh Khanna as Ramesh, Vishnu's friend
 Pandu as Kodandam, Shiva Shankar's servant
 Santhana Bharathi as Gayathri's servant
 Manobala as a police constable
 Suman Setty as Urundai, Vishnu's friend
 Rajalakshmi as Shiva Shankar's mother
 Crane Manohar as an asylum patient
 Idichapuli Selvaraj as Shiva Shankar's servant
 M. S. Baskar as an asylum patient
 Shivashankar as Shiva Shankar's master
 Chitti Babu as a police inspector
 Madhan Bob as the coffee shop owner
 Johnny as Vishnu's friend
 Kadhal Kanth as Vishnu's friend
 Japan Kumar as Japan, Vishnu's friend
 Scissor Manohar as a waiter
 Bava Lakshmanan as a police constable
 Robert (special appearance in the song "Ilamai")
 K. S. Ravikumar as a doctor and Gayathri's family friend (special appearance)

Production
As per director Sunderajan, Varalaru's original base story was scripted by him for Kamal Haasan under the Sivaji Productions banner. This did not happen, however, due to Kamal Haasan's unwillingness to work with Sunderajan as he did not like the script. He felt it would portray him as womaniser.

In late 1999, K. S. Ravikumar narrated two scripts to actor Kamal Haasan. One was about a transgender incorporating three roles titled Madana and a comedy script Thenali. He was impressed with both but turned the offer down due to his conflicting schedule at the time.Rajinikanth too had agreed to do the story titled Madana if Kamal opts out. Ravikumar was forced to pull out of a project titled Jaggubhai which he had written and begun directing and consequently signed on Ajith Kumar, who had just opted out of A. R. Murugadoss's action film, Mirattal. Later, the project shifted to the hands of NIC Arts (from Sri Surya Movies) due to a higher budget. The filming of Godfather began in November 2004, with Ravikumar initially announcing a release date of April 2005. Asin, was added to the film after Jyothika walked out of the project,  while A. R. Rahman was signed on as music composer to the film to be produced by S. S. Chakravarthy. Early reports suggested that one of Ajith's roles in the film would be a eunuch or a transgender, but the role eventually turned out to be that of a classical dancer. Shooting progressed from November 2004 till the end of the year.

In January 2005, it was announced that the film was put on hold due to financial problems, initiating a long delay in the production of the film. The film also faced problems, after the government banned scenes involving excessive smoking in films. Furthermore, in mid-2005, Ajith fell out with the producer, who had made several films with him in the past and stated that the pair would never work together again. The indefinite delay had led to Ajith taking a forced sabbatical, with his market being at a low following the failure of his previous film Ji. Ravi Kumar tried to get in R. B. Choudary and his banner of Super Good Movies to finish the movie but to avail.

Chakravarthy avoided trouble by claiming he would finish the film by 15 June 2005 and signed a contract in March with the Tamil Nadu Producers Committee, who wanted to resolve the problem. The film restarted in April 2005, with a 10-day shoot in Ooty including a song, with Ravikumar revealing that further shots would be filmed in Hyderabad, and then in Canada, and that the film would be ready for release by 22 July 2005. P. C. Sreeram opted out of the film after his dates clashed with his work in Kanda Naal Mudhal and was replaced by Priyan. Actress Meena who was supposed to do play Shivashankar's wife also opted out due a conflicting schedule. Devayani was also considered for the role but she refused as she did not want to scold Ajith and after unfruitful discussion with Simran, Kanika was signed. Problems arose in mid-2005, when Asin could not allot dates for the film due to her work in Ghajini, Majaa and Sivakasi. However, by 15 June, thirty five days work was still required and Ajith was forced to leave the project to begin work on Bala's Naan Kadavul as per the signed contract. Chakravarthy later reported Ajith for the delays and before further problems occurred, L. Suresh of Ananda Pictures, a leading Chennai based distributor, intervened and solved the existing problems by providing an interest-free loan. Subsequently, the film became trouble free but took more than a year to finish the remaining portions and only released in October 2006 as Ajith took priority in completing Paramasivan and Thirupathi. Meanwhile, the title Godfather was reverted to Varalaru (Biography) after the state government gave an order to grant entertainment tax exemption to movies titled in Tamil.

Music

The film's soundtrack and background score were composed by A. R. Rahman, marking his fourth collaboration with Ravikumar after Muthu (1995), Padayappa (1999), Thenali (2000) and third with Ajith Kumar after Pavithra (1994) and Kandukondain Kandukondain (2000). He finished composing all the songs for the film by December 2004. The soundtrack features nine songs, with lyrics written by Vairamuthu. The song "Ilamai" features a remix version, and "Innisai" features a reprise and an extended version of the song which is used in the film. The album was released on 27 September 2006.

Release
The film released on 20 October 2006, during the Diwali season alongside Silambarasan's Vallavan, S. P. Jananathan's E, Saran's Vattaram and Sarath Kumar's Thalaimagan, and emerged as  the biggest hit of the year. Varalaru opened in over 300 screens worldwide including 25 screens in Chennai district. It ran for 210 days and also went on to become  Ajith Kumar's biggest grosser  until the release of his 2007 film, Billa.

Reception 
The critic from The Hindu gave a verdict that the film "scores in pace and performance!" and mentioned that "Ajith's skills as a performer have been appreciably honed and efficiently used" and that it is a "milestone in Ajith's cinema efforts, the film has the potential to propel its hero into a higher league in stardom", while describing Asin as "lustrous and sails through her role smoothly", while Kanika "gets more scope, which she makes good use of". Rediff.com also gave the film a positive review claiming that "Varalaaru is undoubtedly the only must-watch release this Diwali. Watch it for a display of all the elements of Ajith's versatility and range of emotions". The reviewer from Behindwoods praised the film saying "the narration and an implausible screenplay succeed in entertaining the masses", with the critic from Indiaglitz.com citing that "Varalaru will make history.  Ajith's work will certainly uplift to it being  a ultimate legend". Ajith subsequently won the Filmfare Award for Best Actor – Tamil for 2006 for his triple role performance.

Remakes
Ravi Teja announced he was going to remake the film in Telugu in 2007, but eventually did not do so. Further discussions by Pawan Kalyan to do the role in Telugu with Ravikumar as director also failed.

In 2012, cinematographer Sethu Sriram opted to remake the film in Kannada under the original title, Godfather. And in Odia as Tu Mo Dehara Chhai

The movie was unofficially remade in 2015 in Burmese as Nat Khat Mhar Tae Tite Pwal.

References

External links
 

2006 films
Films set in Chennai
Twins in Indian films
Films directed by K. S. Ravikumar
Tamil films remade in other languages
2000s Tamil-language films
Films scored by A. R. Rahman
Films about rape in India